The Comeback is a 1980 Australian documentary film directed by Kit Laughlin and starring Arnold Schwarzenegger. It follows Schwarzenegger as he returns to professional bodybuilding to compete in the 1980 Mr Olympia to regain the title for the 7th time.

Reception
Allmovie gave the film 2 out of 5 stars.

References

External links
 
 

Cultural depictions of Arnold Schwarzenegger
Documentary films about bodybuilding
Australian sports documentary films
1980 in bodybuilding
1980s English-language films